Byram cum Sutton is a civil parish in the Selby District of North Yorkshire, England, containing the village of Byram and the hamlet of Sutton. The River Aire runs to the south of the parish, and the town of Knottingley is the other side of the river in West Yorkshire. The A1 road passes to the west of the parish. According to the 2001 census, it had a population of 1,406, increasing to 1,434 at the 2011 Census.

History 
The civil parish was created in 1891, when the civil parishes of Byram cum Poole and Sutton, both in the West Riding of Yorkshire, were terminated . The new parish became part of Pontefract Rural District when it was formed in 1894, and of Osgoldcross Rural District from 1938.  Under the 1974 local government reforms the parish joined Selby District in the new county of North Yorkshire.

References

External links

Civil parishes in North Yorkshire
Selby District